Ilhéus is a major city located in the southern coastal region of Bahia, Brazil, 211 km south of Salvador, the state's capital.  The city was founded in 1534 as Vila de São Jorge dos Ilhéus and is known as one of the most important tourism centers of the northeast of Brazil.

Geography
As of 2020 Ilhéus had approximately 159,923 inhabitants, with an area of 1850 km sq, and its downtown is located 1 km away from the Atlantic Ocean.

Climate

Ilhéus has a tropical rainforest climate (Köppen: Af).

Conservation

The municipality contains a small part of the  Una Wildlife Refuge, which surrounds the Una Biological Reserve in the neighboring municipality of Una.
It contains 15% of the  Serra do Conduru State Park, created in 1997.
It contains part of the  Lagoa Encantada e Rio Almada Environmental Protection Area, created in 1993.
The APA is threatened by water pollution from sewage and garbage, since most of the communities have no sanitation. There are irregular settlements of squatters in the coastal area. Other threats include irregular fishing, deforestation, fires, hunting and the illegal trade in wild animals.

Economy

The city was once one of the biggest exporters of cocoa beans.

The city's economy is based mainly on tourism, as a result of its beaches and cultural heritage that includes early Portuguese buildings, history and culinary distinctions, which bring to the city many Brazilian and foreign tourists.

Urban infrastructure
There is a proposal for the construction of a new deep water port which due to impact has been opposed by environmental activists but has been accepted by the government as important for the economy.

Transport
 Road: BR-101 connects it to Itabuna and beyond.
 Air: Ilhéus Jorge Amado Airport with daily flights of Azul Brazilian Airlines, GOL and LATAM Brasil
with destinations Belo Horizonte-Confins (CNF), Campinas (VCP), Salvador (SSA), São Paulo-Congonhas (CGH) and São Paulo-Guarulhos (GRU).
 Sea: Port of Ilhéus.

Culture

Ilhéus is the hometown of Jorge Amado, the best known writer in Brazil.  He wrote over 25 novels, which were translated into 48 languages and stayed on bestseller lists in 52 countries.  His novels like Gabriela, Clove and Cinnamon and Dona Flor and Her Two Husbands portray life and customs in the Northeastern region of Brazil.  The plots of these and his other major works largely treat the lives of poor urban and rural black and mulatto communities of Bahia, as well as the land wars that raged in Ilhéus, where cocoa barons killed each other for power and cocoa plantations.

Sister city
 Davenport, Iowa (2005)

Notable people
George Santos Silva, footballer
Ricardo Nascimento, footballer

References

External links

Ilhéus Eventos (in Portuguese)
Emprega Ilhéus (in Portuguese)
Vagas Jovem Aprendiz em Ilhéus (in Portuguese)
Hotel Guide
A Região, notícias de Ilhéus (in Portuguese)
Verao.com - Guia de Ilhéus e região (in Portuguese)
Brasilheus (site in English and Portuguese)
Brasil Destinos (in Portuguese)

 
Populated places established in 1534
Populated coastal places in Bahia
Former Portuguese colonies
1534 establishments in Brazil
Municipalities in Bahia